The parables of Jesus are found in the Synoptic Gospels and some of the non-canonical gospels. They form approximately one third of his recorded teachings. Christians place great emphasis on these parables, which they generally regard as the words of Jesus.

Jesus's parables are seemingly simple and memorable stories, often with imagery, and all teach a lesson in our daily lives. Scholars have commented that although these parables seem simple, the messages they convey are deep, and central to the teachings of Jesus. Christian authors view them not as mere similitudes that serve the purpose of illustration, but as internal analogies in which nature becomes a witness for the spiritual world.

Many of Jesus's parables refer to simple everyday things, such as a woman baking bread (the parable of the Leaven), a man knocking on his neighbor's door at night (the parable of the Friend at Night), or the aftermath of a roadside mugging (the parable of the Good Samaritan); yet they deal with major religious themes, such as the growth of the Kingdom of God, the importance of prayer, and the meaning of love.

In Western civilization, these parables formed the prototype for the term parable and in the modern age, even among those who know little of the Bible, the parables of Jesus remain some of the best-known stories in the world.

Roots and sources

As a translation of the Hebrew word מָשָׁל mashal, the word "parable" can also refer to a riddle. At all times in their history the Jews were familiar with teaching by means of parables and a number of parables also exist in the Old Testament. The use of parables by Jesus was hence a natural teaching method that fit into the tradition of his time. Bishop Tom Wright observes that his parables are similar to the dreams recounted in the Old Testament, which are presented "in search of meanings". The parables of Jesus have been quoted, taught, and discussed since the very beginnings of Christianity.

Nature of the parables
Parables are one of the many literary forms in the Bible, but are especially seen in the gospels of the New Testament. Parables are generally considered to be short stories such as the Good Samaritan, and are differentiated from metaphorical statements such as, "You are the salt of the earth."  A true parable may be regarded as an extended simile. Adolf Jülicher viewed parables as extended metaphors with a picture part (Bildhälfte), a reality part (Sachhälfte), and a point of comparison (tertium comparationis) between the picture part and the reality part. For example, the following parable in Luke 7:31–32 illustrates Jülicher's approach to parables:
To what then will I compare the people of this generation, and what are they like? They are like children sitting in the marketplace and calling to one another:
"We played the flute for you, and 
you did not dance;	
we wailed, and
you did not weep."

Although some suggest parables are essentially extended allegories, others emphatically argue the opposite. Dr. Kenneth Boa states that "Parables are extended figures of comparison that often use short stories to teach a truth or answer a question. While the story in a parable is not historical, it is true to life, not a fairy tale. As a form of oral literature, the parable exploits realistic situations but makes effective use of the imagination...  Some of the parables [of Christ] were designed to reveal mysteries to those on the inside and to conceal the truth to those on the outside who would not hear."

Canonical gospels

The three synoptic gospels contain the parables of Jesus. There are a growing number of scholars who also find parables in the Gospel of John, such as the little stories of the Good Shepherd (John 10:1–5) or the childbearing woman (John 16:21). Otherwise, John includes allegories but no parables. Several authors such as Barbara Reid, Arland Hultgren or Donald Griggs comment that "parables are noticeably absent from the Gospel of John".

William Barry states in the Catholic Encyclopedia (1913) "There are no parables in St. John's Gospel. In the Synoptics ... we reckon thirty-three in all; but some have raised the number even to sixty, by including proverbial expressions". The Gospel of Luke contains both the largest total number of parables (24) and eighteen unique parables; the Gospel of Matthew contains 23 parables of which eleven are unique; and the Gospel of Mark contains eight parables of which two are unique.

In Harmony of the Gospels, Cox and Easley provide a Gospel harmony for the parables based on the following counts: Only in Matthew: 11, only in Mark: 2, only in Luke: 18, Matthew and Luke: 4, Matthew, Mark and Luke: 6. They list no parables for the Gospel of John.

Other documents
Parables attributed to Jesus are also found in other documents apart from the Bible. Some of these overlap those in the canonical gospels and some are not part of the Bible. The non-canonical Gospel of Thomas contains up to fifteen parables, eleven of which have parallels in the four canonical Gospels. The unknown author of the Gospel of Thomas did not have a special word for "parable", making it difficult to know what he considered a parable. Those unique to Thomas include the Parable of the Assassin and the Parable of the Empty Jar.

The noncanonical Apocryphon of James also contains three unique parables attributed to Jesus. They are known as "The Parable of the Ear of Grain", "The Parable of the Grain of Wheat", and "The Parable of the Date-Palm Shoot".

The hypothetical Q document is seen as a source for some of the parables in Matthew, Luke, and Thomas.

Purpose and motive
In the Gospel of Matthew (13:10–17) Jesus provides an answer when asked about his use of parables:

While  and  may suggest that Jesus would only speak to the "crowds" in parables, while in private explaining everything to his disciples, modern scholars do not support the private explanations argument and surmise that Jesus used parables as a teaching method. Dwight Pentecost suggests that given that Jesus often preached to a mixed audience of believers and non-believers, he used parables to reveal the truth to some, but hide it from others.

The Anglican bishop of Montreal, Ashton Oxenden, suggests that Jesus constructed his parables based on his divine knowledge of how man can be taught:

In the 19th century, Lisco and Fairbairn stated that in the parables of Jesus, "the image borrowed from the visible world is accompanied by a truth from the invisible (spiritual) world" and that the parables of Jesus are not "mere similitudes which serve the purpose of illustration, but are internal analogies where nature becomes a witness for the spiritual world".

Similarly, in the 20th century, calling a parable "an earthly story with a heavenly meaning", William Barclay states that the parables of Jesus use familiar examples to lead men's minds towards heavenly concepts. He suggests that Jesus did not form his parables merely as analogies but based on an "inward affinity between the natural and the spiritual order."

Themes
A number of parables that are adjacent in one or more gospels have similar themes. The parable of the Leaven follows the parable of the Mustard Seed in Matthew and Luke, and shares the theme of the Kingdom of Heaven growing from small beginnings. The parable of the Hidden Treasure and parable of the Pearl form a pair illustrating the great value of the Kingdom of Heaven, and the need for action in attaining it.

The parables of the Lost Sheep, Lost Coin, and Lost (Prodigal) Son form a trio in Luke dealing with loss and redemption.

The parable of the Faithful Servant and parable of the Ten Virgins, adjacent in Matthew, involve waiting for a bridegroom, and have an eschatological theme: be prepared for the day of reckoning. The parable of the Tares the parable of the Rich Fool, the parable of the budding fig tree, and the parable of the barren fig tree also have eschatological themes.

Other parables stand alone, such as the parable of the unforgiving servant, dealing with forgiveness; the parable of the Good Samaritan, dealing with practical love; and the parable of the Friend at Night, dealing with persistence in prayer.

Kingdom of Heaven: hearing, seeking, and growing

Loss and redemption

Love and forgiveness

Prayer

Eschatology

Other parables

Art

Of the thirty or so parables in the canonical Gospels, four were shown in medieval art almost to the exclusion of the others, but not mixed in with the narrative scenes of the Life of Christ. These were: the Ten Virgins, the Rich man and Lazarus, the Prodigal Son and the Good Samaritan. Artists famous for depicting parables include Martin Schongauer, Pieter the Elder Bruegal and Albrecht Dürer. The Workers in the Vineyard also appears in Early Medieval works. From the Renaissance the numbers shown widened slightly, and the various scenes of the Prodigal Son became the clear favorite, with the Good Samaritan also popular. Albrecht Dürer made a famous engraving of the Prodigal Son amongst the pigs (1496), a popular subject in the Northern Renaissance, and Rembrandt depicted the story several times, although at least one of his works, The Prodigal Son in the Tavern, a portrait of himself as the Son, revelling with his wife, is like many artists' depictions, a way of dignifying a genre tavern scene. His late The Return of the Prodigal Son (Hermitage Museum, St Petersburg) is one of his most popular works. In 1857 the Brothers Dalziel commissioned John Everett Millais to illustrate the parables, and this work was published in 1864 in London.

Poetry and hymns
As well as being depicted in art and discussed in prose, a number of parables form the inspiration for religious poetry and hymns. For example, the hymn "The Ninety and Nine" by Elizabeth C. Clephane (1868) is inspired by the parable of the Lost Sheep:

Similarly, "My Hope Is Built" (Edward Mote, c. 1834) is inspired by the parable of the Wise and the Foolish Builders, and "How Kind the Good Samaritan" (John Newton, c. 1779) is inspired by the parable of the Good Samaritan.

Harmony of parables
A sample Gospel harmony for the parables based on the list of key episodes in the Canonical Gospels is presented in the table below. For the sake of consistency, this table is automatically sub-selected from the main harmony table in the Gospel harmony article, based on the list of key episodes in the Canonical Gospels. Usually, no parables are associated with the Gospel of John, just allegories.

Parallels outside the canonical gospels
A number of parables have parallels in non-canonical gospels, the Didache, and the letters of Apostolic Fathers. However, given that the non-canonical gospels generally have no time sequence, this table is not a Gospel harmony.

See also
 Chronology of Jesus
 Gospel harmony
 Jesus in Christianity
 Life of Jesus in the New Testament
 Ministry of Jesus
 Miracles of Jesus
 The Tares

References

Notes

Citations

Sources

Further reading

 C. H. Dodd, The Parables of the Kingdom .
 Gowler, David B., 2000. What Are They Saying About the Parables? Mahweh, NJ: Paulist Press. 
 Joachim Jeremias, The Parables of Jesus .
 Schottroff, Luise, 2006. The parables of Jesus 
 Sumner, John Bird, 1850. The parables of our lord and saviour Jesus Christ C. Cox Publishers, London.
 Trinder, William Martin, 1816. Sermons on the parables of Jesus Christ Baldwin, Cradock and Joy Publishers, London.

External links

 Another list, slightly different and only of the synoptic Gospels
 PBS: Frontline: From Jesus to Christ: The Parables

 
Doctrines and teachings of Jesus